Personopsis grasi is a species of medium-sized sea snail, a marine gastropod mollusk in the family Personidae, the Distorsio snails.

Description

Distribution

References

Personidae
Gastropods described in 1872